The 2022 ICC Under-19 Women's T20 World Cup qualification were a series of regional qualification tournaments to determine the final four places at the 2023 ICC Under-19 Women's T20 World Cup. Qualification tournaments were held in Africa, Asia, East-Asia Pacific and Europe.

The Americas region qualifier was scratched and the United States qualified automatically as they were the only ICC associate member in the region who met the ICC's Event Pathway Participation Criteria.

Qualified teams

Africa
The Africa regional qualifier was hosted by Botswana in September 2022. The participating teams were Botswana, Malawi, Mozambique, Namibia, Nigeria, Rwanda, Sierra Leone, Tanzania and Uganda. Rwanda won the qualifier by defeating Tanzania in the final by six wickets, becoming the first Rwanda team to qualify for a Cricket World Cup in any format.

Group One

Group Two

Semi-finals

Third-Place play-off

Final

Asia
The Asian qualifier was hosted by Malaysia between 3-9 June 2022. Thailand and United Arab Emirates were undefeated going into their final round-robin match. The UAE defeated Thailand by six wickets to qualify for the World Cup, the first for a UAE women's team.

 Advanced to the 2023 ICC Under-19 Women's T20 World Cup

Match list

East Asia-Pacific
The East Asia-Pacific qualifier was hosted by Indonesia from 3-5 July 2022.

As Indonesia and Papua New Guinea were the only teams participating, the qualifier was scheduled as a three-match series. Indonesia won the series 2–1 and thus qualified for the 2023 ICC Under-19 Women's T20 World Cup, the first time any cricket team from Indonesia has made it to a World Cup.

Match list

Europe
The European qualifier was a three-match series between Netherlands and Scotland, hosted by the former from 9-11 August 2022. Scotland won the series 3–0 to secure qualification for the Under-19 World Cup.

Match list

References

ICC Under-19 Women's T20 World Cup